is a multi-purpose stadium  in Odate, Akita, Japan. The stadium was originally opened in 1983 and has a capacity of 6,000 spectators. The Sports Park has a baseball stadium and tennis courts.

Naganeyama Ski Jumping Hill

References

External links
Odate City page

Baseball venues in Japan
Football venues in Japan
Multi-purpose stadiums in Japan
Sports venues in Akita Prefecture
Athletics (track and field) venues in Japan
Ōdate
Ski jumping venues in Japan
Sports venues completed in 1983
1983 establishments in Japan